The Kronberg is a mountain of the Appenzell Alps, located west of Appenzell in the Swiss canton of Appenzell Innerrhoden. Its  summit can be accessed by cable car.

The Kronberg is an easily ascendable mountain and a popular excursion destination, and can also be hiked well on signposted snowshoe tours in winter. Valley station operates since June 28, 1999

See also
List of mountains of Switzerland accessible by public transport

References

External links

Kronberg Luftseilbahn
 Kronberg on Hikr
 Spherical panorama of Kronberg

Mountains of Switzerland
Mountains of the Alps
Mountains of Appenzell Innerrhoden
Appenzell Alps
One-thousanders of Switzerland